The elections for the 14th Parliament of Iran was held in November 1943–February 1944 and more than 800 candidates ran for 136 seats.

Ervand Abrahamian wrote in 1982 that the elections were "the most prolonged, most competitive and most meaningful of all elections in modern Iran".

Timeline

Tehran
 24 November 1943: Start of the election
 27 November 1943: End of the election
 30 December 1943: Beginning of reading of votes
 10 February 1944: Declaration of 11 Members-elect of parliament from Tehran. The twelfth was postponed.

Results
Tudeh Party put forward fifteen candidates, nine of whom won seats. The number of the total votes cast for the candidates of the party is estimated at 1.5 million, one-eight of the total votes cast.

Out of the 41,000 total votes cast in Tehran, Mohammad Mossadegh finished first with some 15,000 votes. All Tudeh Party candidates were defeated in the constituency.

In Isfahan, official results showed that Taghi Fadakar became the first deputy with 30,499 votes, and Hessameddin Dowlatabadi and Heidar-Ali Emami were elected for the second and third seats with 29,740 and 28,730 votes respectively.

The top two seats for Tabriz went to Kho'i and Pishevari (Soviet-supported) with 15,883 and 15,780 votes out of 47,780 respectively, but credentials of both were rejected later. The rest of the seven seats in the constituency went to Eskandari, Sadeqi, Seqat ol-Eslam, Ipakchiyan (Soviet-supported), Panahi, Mojtahedi and Sartippur.

The parties that won seats were:

Composition 
According to Ervand Abrahamian, a summarized composition of the parliament that was shaped after at the election is as follows: 

Based on the lines mentioned above for each parliamentary group, the absolute majority of members of parliament were against the royal family and Mohammad Reza Pahlavi:

None of the Sovietophile, Anglophile or American exceptionalist members held the upper hand in the parliament, as a result neutralist votes were decisive:

A characterization of members of the parliament on political spectrum could be as follows:

References

Footnotes

Sources

1944
1944 elections in Asia
1944 in Iran
14th term of the Iranian Majlis
Mohammad Mosaddegh